The British Academy Video Games Award for Animation is an award presented annually by the British Academy of Film and Television Arts (BAFTA). It is given in honor to "the highest level of excellence in bringing a game to life", considering elements such as "player control, non-player characters, ambient/environmental animation, facial animation and cinematics". The category also considers the style, fluidity and responsiveness of the character. 

The category was first presented to Soulcalibur II at the 1st British Academy Games Awards in 2004 under the name Animation or Intro. The following year, it received its current name but was subsequently discontinued. The category was revived at the 16th British Academy Games Awards in 2019. As developers, six studios have received two nominations in the category, though only Insomniac Games and Naughty Dog have achieved any wins. For publishers, Sony Interactive Entertainment hold the record for most nominations, with nine, and also have the most wins in the category, with two.

The current holder of the award is Ratchet & Clank: Rift Apart by Insomniac Games and Sony Interactive Entertainment, which won at the 18th British Academy Games Awards in 2022.

Winners and nominees
In the following table, the years are listed as per BAFTA convention, and generally correspond to the year of game release in the United Kingdom.

 Animation or Intro

Animation

 Note: The games that don't have recipients on the table had Development Team credited on the awards page.

Multiple nominations and wins

Developers

Publishers

References

External links
Official website

Animation